Saad Qureshi is a Pakistani actor, known for his roles in Pakistani television serials including Pukaar, Ki Jaana Main Kaun and  Mehboob Aapke Qadmon Main . 

Qureshi started an online child sponsorship program that is engaged in extending fundamental human rights to the next generation.

Personal life 
The youngest of four brothers, Qureshi was born in Multan and grew up in Islamabad, later moving to Canada to study business at Toronto's York University.

He got engaged to dental surgeon Misha Chaudhry in August 2018 and married her in December 2019.

Career 
After graduation Qureshi joined his family business in Lahore. He started his acting career through a talent Hunt conducted by Geo Entertainment in 2015. His first role was in Television series Khuda Aur Mohabbat season 2  after which Qureshi worked in several dramas including Ghairat 2017 and Shadi Mubarak Ho 2017 for ARY Digital. He is best known for his role in serial Pukaar (2018). In 2018, Qureshi worked for Hum TV in Ki Jaana Main Kaun. In 2019, he appeared as main lead in Meer Abru and Mehboob Apke Qadmon Main. The later of which earned him critical acclaim.

Filmography

Television

Short film

Web

References

External links 
 Saad Qureshi to Instagram

Pakistani male television actors
Living people
People from Multan
21st-century Pakistani male actors
Year of birth missing (living people)